Philip J. Sgriccia (born 1957) is a US television director and producer. He has worked on Lois & Clark: The New Adventures of Superman, Smallville, Supernatural, The Boys, and many other programs.

Partial filmography
 Avalon: Beyond the Abyss (TV movie)
 Charlie Grace
 Cover Me: Based on the True Life of an FBI Family
 Dr. Vegas
 Hack
 Hercules: The Legendary Journeys
 JAG
 Lois & Clark: The New Adventures of Superman
 Midnight Caller
 Night Visions
 Reasonable Doubts
 Revolution
 Supernatural
 Smallville 
 The Agency
 The Boys
 The Cosby Mysteries
 The Fugitive
 The Invisible Man
 Timecop
 Turks
 Xena: Warrior Princess

External links

American television directors
American television producers
Living people
Place of birth missing (living people)
1969 births